Flies & Lies is the second release from the Italian melodic death metal band Raintime. It released in Japan on 21 March 2007, in Sweden, United States, Canada, and the United Kingdom on 25 May, and 28 May for the rest of Europe.

Track listing 

 "Flies & Lies" - 5:01 (Claudio Coassin, Andrea Corona, Enrico Fabris, Luca Michael Martina)
 "Rolling Chances" - 4:38 (Raintime)
 "Apeiron" - 4:21 (Coassin, Corona, Fabris, Martina)
 "Rainbringer" - 4:01 (Coassin, Corona, Fabris, Martina)
 "Finally Me" - 4:34 (Coassin, Corona, Fabris, Martina, Matteo DiBon)
 "Tears of Sorrow" - 3:55 (Coassin, Fabris, Martina, DiBon)
 "The Black Well" - 4:43 (Coassin, Martina)
 "Beat It" (Michael Jackson cover) - 3:44 (Jackson)
 "Another Transition" - 4:27 (Coassin, Fabris, Martina)
 "Burning Doll" - 1:11 (Coassin, Corona, Hansen)
 "Matrioska" - 5:47 (Coassin, Corona, Fabris, Martina, DiBon)

Personnel

Raintime
Claudio Coassin: Vocals, "Animal Sounds"
Matteo DiBon: Rhythm Guitar
Luca Michael Martina: Lead Guitar
Andrea Corona: Keyboards
Michele Colussi: Bass
Enrico Fabris: Drums, Percussion

Additional Personnel
Tommy Hansen: Vocal Backing, Pipe Organ
Lars F. Larsen: Vocal Backing

2007 albums
Raintime albums
Lifeforce Records albums